Kettle corn is a sweet variety of popcorn that is typically mixed or seasoned with a light-colored refined sugar, salt, and oil. It was traditionally made in cast iron kettles, hence the name, but in modern times other types of pots and pans are used.

History in the United States
Kettle corn was introduced to the United States in the 18th century. It is referenced in the diaries of Dutch settlers in Pennsylvania circa 1776. "The origins of Kettle Corn in America may be traced back far earlier; the Native Americans knew of seed preparation through plants such as Amaranth and Goosefoot for millennia. The seeds of these plants would be ground into flour, boiled, toasted, and even popped like modern-day popcorn. Sap and spices would be added for flavor and consistency. Though not popped in a cast-iron kettle, brass kettles or animal stomachs were used."

It was a treat sold at fairs or consumed at other festive occasions. The corn, oil, sugar, and salt are cooked together in a cast iron kettle, or possibly a Dutch oven. This produces a noticeable sweet crust on the popcorn; however, this method requires constant stirring or the sugar will burn. Alternatively, a batch of plain popped corn can be sweetened with sugar or honey before adding salt. This combination was widely popular in the early 19th century but fell from wide usage during the 20th century.

In the early 21st century, kettle corn made a comeback in America, especially at 19th-century living history events. It is cooked and sold at fairs and flea markets throughout the United States, especially art and craft shows. Although modern kettle corn is commonly cooked in stainless steel or copper kettles because of their lighter weight, cast iron cauldrons are still used to publicly cook the corn and mix the ingredients to retain the original flavor.  Recipes for homemade kettle corn are available, and microwave popcorn versions are sold.

See also
 Caramel corn, the popcorn with a darker, thicker, richer tasting candy shell, made with caramelized sugar.

References

External links 
 

Articles containing video clips
Confectionery
Popcorn
American vegetable dishes
American snack foods